Hydroxybutenolide may refer to:

 Tetronic acid (3-hydroxybutenolide)
 5-Hydroxy-2(5H)-furanone (γ-hydroxybutenolide)